National Art Gallery in Islamabad, Pakistan is the country's first national art gallery. Built on a small hillock opposite the Majlis-e-Shoora (the Parliament of Pakistan) and the Aiwan-e-Sadr (the President's House). It opened to the public on Sunday, August 26, 2007. National Art Gallery, Pakistan is a part of the larger organization called Pakistan National Council of the Arts.

In 2007, Director General of PNCA was Naeem Tahir.

In 2017, Director General of Pakistan National Council of Arts (PNCA) was Jamal Shah.

Design
In a nationwide design contest in 1989, the design of Suhail Abbasi & Naeem Pasha of M/s Suhail & Pasha, Architects & Planning Consultants Islamabad was selected for the construction of the National Art Gallery. Their modernistic brick cube is a model of Miesian purity and functionality.

The gallery, with a covered area of 1800 square yards, has 14 galleries with adjacent display areas, lecture halls, workshop and storage facilities, laboratories and a library. The four-storey gallery has modern facilities, including an auditorium with capacity for 400, a theatre, stage facilities and an open-air theatre.

Folk artistes train tours to entertain public
In 2017, Pakistan National Council of the Arts (PNCA) arranged a special train tour for a 36-member troupe of folk artistes aboard the Pakistan Railways Special Azadi Train-2017 to make stops at different railway stations across Pakistan to entertain the public. This special train, with five art galleries and six floats, was specially prepared at the Pakistan Railways Carriage Factory. It was set to start its journey a couple of days before 14 August 2017, which was the independence day of Pakistan.

See also
 List of national galleries

References

External links
Pakistan National Council of the Arts website with pictures of galleries

Art museums and galleries in Pakistan
Buildings and structures in Islamabad
Art museums established in 2007
2007 establishments in Pakistan
Auditoriums in Pakistan
Pakistan